The nations of Israel and Kuwait have no diplomatic relations. Kuwait refuses entry to anyone with a passport issued by Israel or documenting travel to the State of Israel; Israel does not have formal entry or trade restrictions. During the wars between Arab nations and the State of Israel, Kuwaiti forces participated against the State of Israel.

History
Kuwait boycotts Israeli products. In January 2014, Kuwait boycotted a renewable energy conference in Abu Dhabi as it was attended by Israel.

On the heels of the Abraham Accords, in response to Trump announcing that Kuwait could be the next Arab country to recognize Israel, Kuwait denied the claims.

See also
History of the Jews in Kuwait
Ministry of Foreign Affairs (Kuwait)

References

Kuwait
Bilateral relations of Kuwait